Mansurabad-e Bala may refer to:
 Mansurabad-e Bala, Fars
 Mansurabad-e Bala, Kohgiluyeh and Boyer-Ahmad